Augusts Kepke (born 6 January 1886, date of death unknown) was a Latvian cyclist. He competed in two events at the 1912 Summer Olympics for the Russian Empire.

References

External links
 

1886 births
Year of death missing
Latvian male cyclists
Olympic competitors for the Russian Empire
Cyclists at the 1912 Summer Olympics
Sportspeople from Riga